Three Studies for a portrait of Muriel Belcher is an oil on canvas triptych painting by the Irish born English artist Francis Bacon, completed in 1966. It portrays Muriel Belcher, described by musician George Melly as a "benevolent witch",<ref name="nyt">Wheatcroft, Geoffrey. "Den Mother to the Louche and Famous. The New York Times, 5 June 2009. Retrieved 13 October 2018</ref> and the charismatic founder and proprietress of The Colony Room Club, a private drinking house at 41 Dean Street, Soho, London, where Bacon was a regular throughout the late 1940s to late 1960s.

The two became friends soon after she opened the club in 1948, and Bacon helped her cultivate its reputation as a seedy but convivial meeting place for artists, writers, musicians, homosexuals and bohemians. At its height, regular patrons included Lucian Freud, Jeffrey Bernard, John Deakin and Henrietta Moraes.

Belcher died in 1979 in her early 70s. Having been exhibited at Tate, London, and Galeries nationales du Grand Palais, Paris, the triptych is currently was as of 2022 in a private collection.

Model
Both Belcher and Bacon shared a sharp, dry and often and caustic wit, which bordered on sarcastic and aloof disdain. They cultivated an at times intimidating atmosphere, and she became the subject of several of his paintings, including Seated Woman (Portrait of Muriel Belcher), which in sold 2007 for €13.7 million. Bacon did not paint from life sittings, and it is likely that he painted this triptych from photographs taken by Deakin.

Description
Each of the panels are set against flat, dark and nondescript backgrounds. The portraits captures Belcher's personality, expressed through her flowing hair, arched eyebrows and prominent nose. From left to right, the panels show her in half profile looking to the viewer's right, in full profile, and in half profile looking to our left, in a sequence that evokes a sense of movement akin to the photographs of Eadweard Muybridge or police mug shots. Her facial features are heavily distorted in each, an effect achieved by long and wider brush strokes. Bacon uses contrasting colour pallets to change the tone and the mood of the panels; the fiery and aggressive reds of the center portrait contrast with the calmer blue-grey tones of the right hand image. The triptych follows in a pattern of panels painted of close friends in a similar distorted style during the late 1960s and very early 1970s.

References

Sources

 Muir, Robin. A Maverick Eye: The Street Photography of John Deakin. London: Thames & Hudson, 2002. 
 Farr, Dennis; Peppiatt, Michael; Yard, Sally. Francis Bacon: A Retrospective. New York: Harry N Abrams, 1999. 
 Ficacci, Luigi. Francis Bacon: 1909–1992''. London: Taschen, 2003.

External links
 The Colony Room Club 1965 - 1965 footage of the Colony Room Club in 1965 including shots of Muriel Belcher

1966 paintings
Paintings by Francis Bacon
Portraits of women